Khe or KHE may refer to:

 Khē, Arabic letter
 Khe language, a language of Burkina Faso
 Khe, the name of the Nepali language among the Newar people
 Kaposiform hemangioendothelioma, a tumor
 Kherson International Airport, Kherson Oblast, Ukraine (IATA code)